Allen House is a historic home located on the Alamance Battleground State Historic Site near Burlington, Alamance County, North Carolina. It was built in 1782, and is a two-story, hewn log dwelling with a gable roof. It rests on a stone foundation.  The Allen house was moved to the Alamance Battleground in 1966 and restored as a homestead dwelling.

It was added to the National Register of Historic Places in 1970.

References

Houses on the National Register of Historic Places in North Carolina
Houses completed in 1782
Houses in Alamance County, North Carolina
Museums in Alamance County, North Carolina
National Register of Historic Places in Alamance County, North Carolina
1782 establishments in North Carolina